In UK public law, the duty of candour is  the duty imposed on a public authority 'not to seek to win [a] litigation at all costs but
to assist the court in reaching the correct result and thereby to improve standards in public administration'. Lord Donaldson MR in R v Lancashire County Council ex p. Huddleston  stated that public servants should be willing 'to explain fully what has occurred and why'.

There is also a contractual duty of candour imposed on all NHS and non-NHS providers of services to NHS patients in the UK to 'provide to the service user and any other relevant person all necessary support and all relevant information' in the event that a 'reportable patient safety incident' occurs. A 'reportable patient safety incident' is one which could have or did result in moderate or severe harm or death.

Campaigner Will Powell  led a campaign for NHS managers and doctors to have a formal 'duty of candour' when dealing with complaints about negligent or poor standards of care in NHS hospitals.

In January 2014 David Behan, chief executive of the Care Quality Commission, threw his weight behind a wide definition for the statutory duty of candour which was recommended by the Francis Report.  The Government originally intended the duty to be limited to cases of “severe harm” – when a patient had been killed or left permanently disabled, as a wider reporting requirement could inundate organisations with unnecessary bureaucracy.  The CQC estimates there are about 11,000 incidents of severe harm per year, and up to 100,000 incidents of serious harm, although there may be significant under reporting of both. The charity Action Against Medical Accidents has been campaigning for a wide definition and Behan made it clear that he was supporting them.

See also
Doctor–patient relationship
Duty of disclosure
Information disclosure statement

References

Health law in the United Kingdom
National Health Service